Steve Burton is the Sports Director for WBZ-TV and WSBK-TV in Boston. His birthday is on August 11th. The son of former Boston Patriots player Ron Burton, Steve Burton grew up in Framingham, Massachusetts and is a graduate of and a former quarterback for  Northwestern University holding a bachelor of science degree in Communications and a master's degree in Broadcast journalism.  He lives in the Boston area with his wife Virginia and four children.

Career
Starting in 1993, Burton worked as a sports anchor and reporter for New England Sports Network (NESN), hosting the pre and post game shows for the Boston Red Sox.

In 1994, Burton joined WBZ-TV, where he now is sports director and main anchor.  He also anchors the weekly programs Sports Final, Patriots Game Day, All Access, and the Patriots 5th Quarter show.
 
Burton is also a frequent guest on WEEI's The Big Show certain times of the year. Nicknamed "vest" for his sharp dress, Burton is occasionally criticized for showing up late on the radio and is also ribbed for his appetite, as he ate nine large slices of pizza on the air during a 2009 broadcast.

Burton is a friend of controversial former baseball player Jose Canseco and has featured Canseco on an occasional weekend show he hosts on WEEI, most famously on October 14, 2007 during the New England Patriots' game against the Dallas Cowboys, though the football game was never mentioned as the subject was baseball's continuing steroids controversy. Burton also has arranged interviews with Canseco for WEEI.

Burton became WBZ's sports director following Bob Lobel's firing in early April 2008.

Family
Two of his daughters are former NCAA Division 1 basketball players, Kayla for Lehigh University and Kendall for Villanova University. His daughter, Veronica, was drafted 7th overall in the 2022 WNBA draft by the Dallas Wings. His son Austin graduated from UCLA and is currently a quarterback for the Purdue Boilermakers.

Community service
Burton spends time working at the Ron Burton Training Village, a 5-week sports camp for inner city youths. That organization awarded him the MIAA/Ron Burton Community Service Award in 2003.  He also serves as a board member on several children's charities including the Doug Flutie, Jr. Foundation for Autism and the Fellowship of Christian Athletes.

References

External links
 
 WBZ-TV Bio
 MIAA Awards

Major League Baseball broadcasters
National Football League announcers
Sportswriters from Massachusetts
American television reporters and correspondents
Place of birth missing (living people)
Year of birth missing (living people)
Medill School of Journalism alumni
Living people
Television anchors from Boston
African-American television personalities
American sports journalists
21st-century African-American people